Gluviopsis is a genus of daesiid camel spiders, first described by Karl Kraepelin in 1899.

Species 
, the World Solifugae Catalog accepts the following eleven species:

 Gluviopsis atrata Pocock, 1900 — India
 Gluviopsis balfouri (Pocock, 1895) — Yemen
 Gluviopsis butes Delle Cave & Simonetta, 1971 — Somalia
 Gluviopsis caporiaccoi Vachon, 1950 — Niger
 Gluviopsis microphthalmus Birula, 1937 — Turkmenistan
 Gluviopsis nigripalpis (Pocock, 1897) — Ethiopia, Somalia
 Gluviopsis nigrocinctus Birula, 1905 — Afghanistan, Azerbaijan, Iran, Tajikistan, Turkmenistan
 Gluviopsis paphlagoniae Turk, 1960 — Turkey
 Gluviopsis rivae (Pavesi, 1897) — Somalia
 Gluviopsis rufescens (Pocock, 1897) — Djibouti, Greece (Rhodes), Iraq, Somalia, Yemen
 Gluviopsis somalica Roewer, 1933 — Somalia

References 

Arachnid genera
Solifugae